Bossiaea linophylla is a species of flowering plant in the family Fabaceae and is endemic to the south-west of Western Australia. It is a spreading shrub with linear to oblong or egg-shaped leaves, and bright yellow to orange or apricot-coloured and red flowers.

Description
Flowering occurs from July to December.

Taxonomy and naming
Bossiaea linophylla was first formally described in 1812 by Robert Brown in William Aiton's Hortus Kewensis. The specific epithet (linophylla) means "thread-leaved".

Distribution and habitat
This bossiaea is found between Collie, Augusta, Albany and the Stirling Range in the Avon Wheatbelt, Esperance Plains, Jarrah Forest, Swan Coastal Plain and Warren biogeographic regions where it grows in forest, woodland and heath and is often the dominant understorey species.

Conservation status
Bossiaea linophylla is classified as "not threatened" by the Western Australian Government Department of Parks and Wildlife.

Ecology
The plant attracts moyadong, parrot subspecies Platycercus icterotis icterotis, which eat their fruit.

References

linophylla
Flora of Western Australia
Taxa named by Robert Brown (botanist, born 1773)
Plants described in 1812